Ivela is a genus of moths in the subfamily Lymantriinae. The genus was erected by Charles Swinhoe in 1903. The type species is I. auripes.

Species
 Butler, 1877
Ivela eshanensis C. L. Chao, 1983 (transferred to Himala eshanensis since 2000)
 Eversmann, 1847
Ivela yini Xie & Wang, 2022

References

Kishida, Yasunori (2000). "A new species of the genus Himala Moore, 1879 (Lepidoptera, Lymantriidae) from Vietnam". Lepidoptera Science. 51 (3): 231–232. 

Lymantriinae
Noctuoidea genera